Georgi Danchov (1846–1908) was a Bulgarian Renaissance artist, photographer, illustrator, cartoonist, comics artist, caricaturist and a revolutionary.

He was one of the closest associates of Vasil Levski and the author considered the most accurate portrait of the Apostle. Georgi Danchov, father of Nicholas and Ivan Danchov, was one of the compilers of the first Bulgarian encyclopedias and numerous dictionaries.

On May 24, 1869 Levski visited Chirpan where he stayed at the home of Georgi Danchov and the local Secret Committee based there.  During the revolutionary movement, he (also known as Zografina) was exiled in Diyarbakir with a life sentence, but fled to Russia in 1876 and even during his exile artistic enthusiasm keep the pressure – there lithography creates "Mermaids". During the Russo-Turkish War, taking part in the Bulgarian volunteers, and after the liberation – in Rumelian coup.  Danchov was a public figure: a member of the interim government in Plovdiv, and repeatedly elected to Parliament.  In 1879, Plovdiv he created his legendary work – lithography entitled "Free Bulgaria".

Georgi Danchov painted icons for churches in Plovdiv, Chirpan, Stara Zagora, Kazanlak. In 1861 izografisva altar apse of the Arapovo monastery St. Nedelja (also called Zlatovrahski monastery) and the vault of the monastery church of St. Spas "near Sopot. In 1865 he went to Constantinople, where he studied lithography. His first lithographic works are portraits of Medhat Pasha and composition Raina Princess in the cave. In 1867, on behalf of Nayden Gerov create 17 themed pictures with images of Bulgarian costumes and domestic scenes, presented an exhibition in Moscow University. Besides Levski, painted portraits and other Bulgarian revolutionaries and public figures: Hristo Botev, Georgi Rakovski, Zahari Stoyanov, Stefan Stambolov. Danchov is one of the founders of Bulgarian secular painting and one of the first photographers in Bulgaria. He is also considered to be the first Bulgarian comics artist, as he created caricatures and cartoons with sequences for 19th-century magazines. In 1890 he created a text comic named The Six Feelings.

References 
 "Георги Данчов Зографина. Документален роман", Петър Стъпов, Издателство "Народна младеж", София, 1979

Sources

External links 

 Георги Данчов — Зографина. Виртуална галерия
 Стенописите на Георги Данчов —Зографина в църквата „Въведение Богородично”, Стефка Крачанова

1846 births
1908 deaths
Bulgarian photographers
Bulgarian comics artists
Bulgarian illustrators
Bulgarian cartoonists
Bulgarian caricaturists
Bulgarian revolutionaries
Members of the National Assembly (Bulgaria)
19th-century Bulgarian people
19th-century Bulgarian painters
19th-century male artists
20th-century Bulgarian painters
People from Chirpan
19th-century Bulgarian artists
20th-century Bulgarian male artists
19th-century photographers
20th-century photographers
Male painters